The men's team recurve competition at the 2001 World Archery Championships took place in September 2001 in Beijing, China. 125 archers took part in the men's recurve qualification round with no more than 4 from each country, and the 16 teams of 3 archers with the highest cumulative totals (out of a possible 26) qualified for the 4-round knockout round, drawn according to their qualification round scores.

Seeds
Seedings were based on the combined total of the team members' qualification scores in the individual ranking rounds. The top 16 teams were assigned places in the draw depending on their overall ranking.

Draw

References

2001 World Archery Championships